Jerry Murrien de Jong (born 29 August 1964) is a Dutch former professional footballer who played as a defender or defensive midfielder.

He played for seven clubs (one in France) during a 17-year professional career, including PSV Eindhoven.

Career
Born in Paramaribo, Suriname, de Jong started off his career in the second division, where he played for Telstar and SC Heerenveen. He earned a reputation as a tough tackler, and his performances did not go unnoticed by Eredivisie clubs, as he joined PSV Eindhoven in the summer of 1989.

At Eindhoven, de Jong's career never really picked up due to the stiff competition for a starting line-up berth, and after having played only 51 games in five years, which included a short loan spell at FC Groningen, he was eventually released. However, during his time at PSV, he was capped three times for the Netherlands, making his debut on 21 November 1990 against Greece in a UEFA Euro 1992 qualifying match; his last international was on 17 April 1991 against Finland, for the same competition.

De Jong moved to France in 1994, signing with Ligue 1 side Stade Malherbe Caen. After an uneventful season (only 15 matches, relegation), he returned home, playing for lowly FC Eindhoven and MVV Maastricht; he retired at almost 37.

Personal life
De Jong's son, Nigel, was also a footballer who represented the Netherlands at international level.

References

External links
Beijen profile 
Stats at Voetbal International 

1964 births
Living people
Surinamese emigrants to the Netherlands
Sportspeople from Paramaribo
Dutch footballers
Association football defenders
Association football midfielders
Eredivisie players
Eerste Divisie players
SC Telstar players
SC Heerenveen players
PSV Eindhoven players
FC Groningen players
FC Eindhoven players
MVV Maastricht players
Ligue 1 players
Stade Malherbe Caen players
Netherlands international footballers
Dutch expatriate footballers
Expatriate footballers in France
Dutch expatriate sportspeople in France